Movietime Cinemas is one of India's oldest multiplex chains and has only shown tremendous growth and continuous progress over the years. Lalit Kapur, is the Managing Director of Movietime Cinemas and the backbone of the aspiring expansion. Since 1998, along with his younger brother Anil Kapur, he has driven the organization to a remarkable growth. It operates multiplexes in all the major cities of India.

History 
It all began for the company in 1968 when O. P. Kapur founded Kamal Cinema in the Green Park area of Delhi. Year after year, the cinema saw an increase in the number of people coming to enjoy their favourite films and the cinema soon became an experience individual would cherish.

In India, Movietime Cinemas entered the business with Movietime: Malad West, Mumbai as their first location and now operates a total of 65 screens in 22 properties across 15 cities all over India. Recognizing tremendous growth in the foreign markets, Mr. O.P Kapur's eldest son, Arun Kapur moved to Peru, South America and presently has established more than 150 screens under brand names “Cinestar” & “Movietime”.

Locations 
List of Movietime Cinemas across India

Movietime Cinemas endeavors to set up more than 100 screens till 2020. The new upcoming screens will be equipped with advanced projection & audio technology for finest movie experience for the patrons.

International Presence 
The following are the multiplexes in Lima, Peru.

References

External links
 http://www.movietimecinemas.in/

Companies based in Mumbai
Cinema chains in India
1998 establishments in Maharashtra
Indian companies established in 1998
Entertainment companies established in 1998